John Sama (born 24 March 1972) is a retired Sierra Leonean football midfielder. He was a squad member for the 1994 and 1996 African Cup of Nations.

References

1972 births
Living people
Sierra Leonean footballers
Sierra Leone international footballers
Degerfors IF players
Association football midfielders
Sierra Leonean expatriate footballers
Expatriate footballers in Sweden
Sierra Leonean expatriate sportspeople in Sweden
Superettan players
Allsvenskan players
1994 African Cup of Nations players
1996 African Cup of Nations players